The bowtie is a type of road intersection which replaces left turns (in jurisdictions that drive on the right) or right turns (in jurisdictions that drive on the left), with roundabouts on the cross street. It is an alternative to the Michigan left intersection.

Design 
Left turns are prohibited at the main intersection, which therefore requires only a two-phase signal.  Vehicles yield upon entry to the roundabout. If the roundabout has only two entrances, the entry from the main intersection does not have to yield. 

A bowtie can be adapted from an existing generic intersection that has two nearby roundabouts, so long as the roundabouts are on opposing sides of the intersection. 

The roundabout diameter, including the center island and circulating roadway, varies from  depending on the speed of traffic on the approaches, the volume of traffic served, the number of approaches, and the design vehicle.

This configuration would reduce delay for the arterial street, increase capacity, and reduce the number of stops required.  The primary problem with such a configuration is driver disregard for the left turn prohibition at the main intersection.

As yet no agency has designed a complete bowtie road junction.

See also

Hamburger roundabout/throughabout/cut-through roundabout

References

External links
Unconventional Left-Turn Alternatives for Urban and Suburban Arterials An Update (pdf)
Eliminating Left-Turns at a Signalized Intersection With The Use of Nearby Roundabouts (pdf)
 Guidance on the Safe Implementation of Unconventional Arterial Designs (pdf)
 FHWA-HRT-04-091: Signalized Intersections: Informational Guide

Road junction types
Roundabouts and traffic circles